The 1968 New Zealand Grand Prix was a race held at the Pukekohe Park Raceway on 6 January 1968.  The race had 21 starters.

It was the 15th New Zealand Grand Prix, and doubled as the opening round of the 1968 Tasman Series.  Chris Amon became the third New Zealander to win his home GP, joining Bruce McLaren and original GP winner John McMillan.

Classification 
Results as follows:

References

New Zealand Grand Prix
Grand Prix
Tasman Series
January 1968 sports events in New Zealand